Quicksilver is the sixth album by American psychedelic rock band Quicksilver Messenger Service.

Background
Released in November 1971, it was the first album without original members John Cipollina and David Freiberg. Nicky Hopkins had also left at this point to continue his successful journeyman career. Only Gary Duncan and Greg Elmore remained from the original quartet. The album also saw a major decline in sales: whereas their previous four albums had reached the Top 30 on Billboard, Quicksilver failed to dent the Top 100.

Track listing
All songs written by Dino Valenti except where indicated.

Side one
"Hope" – 3:01
"I Found Love" (Gary Duncan) – 3:56
"Song for Frisco" - 4:58
"Play My Guitar" – 4:38
"Rebel" (traditional, arranged by Dino Valenti) – 2:02

Side two
"Fire Brothers" (Duncan) – 3:12
"Out of My Mind" – 4:34
"Don't Cry My Lady Love" – 5:13
"The Truth" – 6:58

Personnel
 Dino Valenti – guitar, vocals, flute, percussion
 Gary Duncan - guitar, vocals
 Mark Naftalin –organ, piano
 Mark Ryan – bass
 Greg Elmore – drums, percussion

Charts
 Album

Billboard (United States)

References

Quicksilver Messenger Service albums
1971 albums
Capitol Records albums